Cyan is a range of colors in the blue/green part of the spectrum.

Cyan may also refer to:

Arts, entertainment, and media

Fictional characters
 Cyan (cat), a cat in the Japanese manga series Free Collars Kingdom
 Cyan (comic strip character), a character in the Norwegian comic strip Nemi
 Tor Cyan, a character in the science fiction-oriented comic 2000 AD
 Cyan Fitzgerald, a female child character from Spawn comic books
 Cyan Garamonde, a male character in the role-playing game Final Fantasy VI

Music
 Cyan (Closterkeller album), or the title track
 Cyan (EP), a 2020 EP by South Korean singer/songwriter Kang Daniel
 Cyan (Three Dog Night album), 1973
 "Cyan", a song by Ellie Goulding from her 2020 album Brightest Blue

Brands and enterprises
 Cyan, Inc., a telecommunications company that was acquired by Ciena
 Cyan Worlds, also known as Cyan, Inc., a computer game company